Euryn may refer to:

 Euryn (given name)

Places
 Bryn Euryn, a Site of Special Scientific Interest in Conwy County Borough, Wales
 Llys Euryn, an historic estate owned by Ednyfed Fychan ap Cynwrig (d. 1246), ancestor of Owen Tudor

People
  (1942–2021), Welsh broadcaster, presenter and writer